United We Stand was a professional wrestling internet pay-per-view (iPPV) event produced by Impact Wrestling that took place on April 4, 2019 in Rahway, New Jersey. It was the second event in the 2019 Impact Wrestling pay-per-view schedule.  Wrestlers from Lucha Libre AAA Worldwide (AAA) and Lucha Underground – with whom Impact has partnerships with – as well as stars from Major League Wrestling (MLW), Dragon Gate and Wrestle Pro also appeared on the card. The event was also streamed live on FITE TV.

The card had eight matches. The main event featured the "First-Ever" Confrontation between Impact World Tag Team Champions The Lucha Bros (Fénix and Pentagón Jr.) against Rob Van Dam and Sabu. Both the Impact Knockouts Championship and Impact X Division Championship were defended on the card, as Knockouts Champion Taya Valkyrie defended against Rosemary, Jordynne Grace and Katie Forbes while Rich Swann and AAA's Flamita wrestled for Swann's Impact X Division Championship.  The event's undercard saw a six-man Ultimate X match for an X Division Championship match, Tessa Blanchard and Joey Ryan wrestling in an intergender match, and various other matches.

Storylines 

The event featured professional wrestling matches that involve different wrestlers from pre-existing scripted feuds and storylines. Wrestlers portrayed villains, heroes, or less distinguishable characters in the scripted events that built tension and culminated in a wrestling match or series of matches. On February 22, 2019,  Impact Wrestling announced the date for United We Stand. On the same day, three matches were announced for the event.

Results

See also
2019 in professional wrestling
List of Impact Wrestling pay-per-view events

References

2019 Impact Wrestling pay-per-view events
Professional wrestling in New Jersey
Events in New Jersey
2019 in New Jersey
April 2019 events in the United States
Rahway, New Jersey
Professional wrestling joint events